James Linton Griffin (July 11, 1886 – February 11, 1950), nicknamed "Pepper", was a pitcher in Major League Baseball. He played for the Chicago Cubs and Boston Braves.

References

External links

1886 births
1950 deaths
Major League Baseball pitchers
Chicago Cubs players
Boston Rustlers players
Boston Braves players
Baseball players from Texas
Minor league baseball managers
Argenta Shamrocks players
Augusta Tourists players
Atlanta Crackers players
Venice Tigers players
People from Whitehouse, Texas